The Congolese National Liberation Front (FLNC) is a political party funded by rebels of Katangese origin and composed of ex-members of the Katangese Gendarmerie. It was active mainly in Angola and Zaire during the 1970s. 

The FLNC was formed in Angola under the leadership of Nathaniel Mbumba, with the goal of expelling Mobutu Sese Seko, the leader of Zaire. The FLNC is best known for its two attempted invasions of Katanga Province (renamed Shaba) in Zaire in 1977 and 1978. These incursions, which threatened Mobutu's regime, sparked two international wars, Shaba I and Shaba II, further complicating the Angolan Civil War. The FLNC became a member of the political life of Zaire after the year 1991, and then later a member of the Democratic Republic of the Congo.

Foundation 

The FLNC originated as the Katangese Gendarmerie, the military of the secessionist State of Katanga during the Congo Crisis. After the defeat of the Katanga Secession, many of the black Katanga troops were forced into exile in Portuguese Angola in the mid-1960s. Led by  Nathaniel Mbumba, they fought for the Portuguese colonial power during the Angolan War of Independence and eventually formed the FLNC in 1967. After the defeat of the Portuguese in 1974, they joined the victorious MPLA.

The FLNC did not have any political program other than ending Mobutu's grip on Zaire. FLNC troops were said to have been trained by Cuban advisers.

The FLNC was formed in Angola under the leadership of Nathaniel Mbumba with the goal of expelling Mobutu Sese Seko, the leader of Zaire.

Shaba I

The FLNC, numbering about 1500 people, invaded Shaba (the new name of the Katanga) from eastern Angola on 7 March 1977. Seeking to overthrow Mobutu, the FLNC quickly captured Kolwezi, Kasaji, and Mutshatsha. Mobutu appealed to William Eteki of Cameroon, Chairman of the Organization of African Unity, for assistance on 2 April. The French government airlifted 1,500 Moroccan troops into Kinshasa on 10 April. The French reinforcements worked in conjunction with the Zairian Armed Forces to beat back the FLNC with air cover from Egyptian pilots flying French-built FAZ Dassault Mirage 5 fighter jets. The Egyptian-Moroccan force pushed the last of the militants, along with several refugees, into Angola and Zambia by April.

Shaba II 

During the Shaba II intervention, 4000 rebels took the city of Kolwezi. Nathaniel Mbumba reportedly lost control of his troops, and they began executing European and Zairean civilians. Most of the regulars soon retreated. The irregulars were driven back into the Angolan People's Republic after the French Foreign Legion intervention during the Battle of Kolwezi.

Later actions 
Mbumba was expelled from the party in 1987. In 1990, Mobutu began a process to restore multi partyism. The FLNC was legalized in 1991 and its members came back to Zaire. During the First Congo War, the FLNC fought on the side of the Zairian army due to shared opposition to the presence of Rwandan troops in Zaire, but subsequently became favourable to the AFDL rebels led by Laurent-Désiré Kabila. The FLNC joined the opposition under Joseph Kabila's presidency.

See also
Second Congo War
Progressive Congolese Students

Notes

Further reading 
 Erik Kennes and Miles Larmer, The Katangese Gendarmes and War in Central Africa: Fighting their Way Home, Bloomington, IN: Indiana University Press, 2016. Pp. 318. $35 (pbk).
 Official website

References
 

African and Black nationalist organizations in Africa
Rebel groups in the Democratic Republic of the Congo
History of Katanga
Zaire
Political parties in the Democratic Republic of the Congo
Expatriate military units and formations